Bolzano ( or ; ,  (formerly ); ;  or ) is the capital city of the province of South Tyrol in northern Italy.  With a population of 108,245, Bolzano is also by far the largest city in South Tyrol and the third largest in historical Tyrol. The greater metro area has about 250,000 inhabitants and is one of the urban centers within the Alps.
 
Bolzano is the seat of the Free University of Bozen-Bolzano, where lectures and seminars are held in English, German, and Italian.  The city is also home to the Italian Army's Alpini High Command (COMALP) and some of its combat and support units.

In the 2020 version of the annual ranking of quality of life in Italian cities, Bolzano was ranked joint first for quality of life alongside Bologna.

Along with other Alpine towns in South Tyrol, Bolzano engages in the Alpine Town of the Year Association for the implementation of the Alpine Convention.  The Convention aims to promote and achieve sustainable development in the Alpine Arc.  Consequently, Bolzano was awarded Alpine Town of the Year 2009.

Bolzano is considered a bridge between Northern Europe  and Southern Europe due to the three spoken languages in South Tyrol (Italian, German, and Ladin) and the confluence of Italian and German-Austrian culture.

Geography

Location
The area of the city of Bolzano is 52.3 km2 (20 sq. mi.), of which 28 km2 (10 sq. mi.) is used as a settlement area.  The city is located in the basin where the Sarntal, Eisacktal, and the Adige Valley with their rivers, Talfer, Eisack, and Adige, meet.  In the Middle Ages, the two main Alpine crossings, the Via Claudia Augusta over Reschenpass and the Brenner route over Brenner Pass, met in Bolzano.  Thus, the city was very important for the trade.  The highest point is 1616 metres (5302') above sea level and the lowest point is 232 metres (761') above sea level.  The center is located at an altitude of 262 metres (860') above sea level.  The nearest big cities are 58 km (36 miles) (Trento) and 118 km (73 miles) (Innsbruck) away.

City districts and neighbouring communities

City districts (most district names were originally in German and italianized at a later stage):

 Centro-Piani-Rencio/Zentrum-Bozner Boden-Rentsch
 Don Bosco/Don Bosco-Neugries
 Europa-Novacella/Europa-Neustift
 Gries-San Quirino/Gries-Quirein
 Oltrisarco-Aslago/Oberau-Haslach

In 1911 Zwölfmalgreien and in 1925 the municipality Gries were incorporated in the city of Bolzano. Neighbouring communities are: Eppan, Karneid, Laives, Deutschnofen, Ritten, Jenesien, Terlan and Vadena.

Climate
Being located at multiple climate borders, Bolzano features a humid subtropical climate (Cfa) with hot summers and very cold winters by Italian standards.  According to the Trewartha classification, this climate could not be really considered a subtropical climate because fewer than 8 months are at least , and thus would be considered a semi-continental climate with hot summers.  Some of its suburbs are designated an oceanic climate (Cfb) based on cooler summer temperatures, while mountains in the area may feature a continental climate (Dfb).  The climate of Bolzano is influenced by its low altitude in a valley south of the main alps.  This causes very sheltered conditions from cool winds during daytime, ensuring much warmer temperatures year-round than in similar valley cities north of the range.

Society

Linguistic distribution

According to the 2011 census, 73.80% of the city's inhabitants spoke Italian, 25.52% German and 0.68% Ladin as their first language.

Through fascism and the Italianization policy under Benito Mussolini in the inter-war period, the Italian language group became the majority in Bolzano. Prior to the annexation of South Tyrol to Italy (Treaty of Saint-Germain-en-Laye, 1919) a small Italophone community of up to 10% of the population already lived in Bolzano.

History

Prehistory and Roman settlement 
The modern-day Bolzano was in ancient times a marshy region inhabited by the Raetian Isarci people, traditionally believed to be descendants of Etruscan refugees fleeing Italy from the invading Gauls. The Romans built a settlement after the area had been conquered in 15 BC by general Nero Claudius Drusus. The military settlement, Pons Drusi (Drusus Bridge), was named after this Roman general. During this time the area became part of the region Venetia et Histria (Regio X) of ancient Italy.

In 1948, excavations of the current Cathedral led to the discovery of an ancient Christian basilica from the fourth century. Also discovered was a Roman cemetery, including the tomb of "Secundus Regontius" with Latin inscriptions dating to the third century, making him the oldest known inhabitant of Bolzano.

Bavarian settlement 
During the gradual decline of the Lombard influence in the seventh century, Bavarian immigration took place and the first mention of a Bavarian ruler in Bolzano dates from 679. At that time, the Bavarians named the nearby villages around Bolzano Bauzanum or Bauzana. In 769 Tassilo III, Duke of Bavaria issued in Bolzano the foundation charter of the Innichen Abbey. German populations have been present in the region of Tyrol from that period onwards. At around the year 1000, the settlement is called "in Pauzana valle, quae lingua Teutisca Pozana nuncupatur".

Bishopric of Trent 

In 1027 the area of Bolzano and the rest of the diocese was conferred, by the emperor Conrad II from the Salian dynasty, upon the bishops of Trent. In the late-12th century, the bishop founded a market town, along the Lauben thoroughfare.

County of Tyrol 
In 1277 Bolzano was conquered by Meinhard II, the Count of Tyrol, leading to a struggle between the counts of Tyrol and the bishops of Trent. In 1363, the County of Tyrol passed to the Austrian House of Habsburg. In 1381, Duke Leopold granted the citizens of Bolzano the privilege of a town council. This gradually eliminated the influence and power previously held by the bishops of Trent over the next few decades. In 1462, the bishops eventually resigned all their rights of jurisdiction over the town.

From the 14th and 15th centuries onwards, a large market fair was organised four times per year to greet tradesmen and merchants en-route the Brenner Pass. The Mercantile Magistrate was therefore founded in 1635 by the Austrian duchess Claudia de' Medici. During every market season, two Italian and two Germanic officers, who were appointed among the local tradesmen, worked in this magistrate office. The establishment of an official trade organisation strengthened Bolzano as a cultural crossroad in the Alps.

After the dissolution of the Holy Roman Empire in 1806, Bolzano became briefly part of the Napoleonic Kingdom of Italy and was incorporated into the Department of Alto Adige. After the Congress of Vienna (1814-15) Bolzano returned to the County of Tyrol, within the Austrian Empire and subsequently the Dual Monarchy of Austria-Hungary in 1867. The County covered both modern-day South Tyrol, Trentino and the federal state of Tyrol (including  East Tyrol) in Austria.

In 1915, the Triple Entente powers promised Italy territorial gains if she would enter the First World War on the side of the Entente instead of siding with the German Empire and Austria-Hungary. When Italy abandoned the Triple Alliance (1882), the Entente offered her territorial promises in Tyrol and Istria. This secret arrangement was confirmed in the Treaty of London (1915).

After Italy declared war on Austria-Hungary on May 24, 1915, heavy fighting took place all along Tyrol's southern border for the entire duration of the conflict. For the next  years Tyrol's southern border became the front line between Austro-Hungarian and Italian troops. Tyrol's south frontier was - and still is - dotted with tens of defensive fortresses that had been built in view of a possible Italian attack. Losses on both sides amount to several thousands. During World War I, tens of thousands of civilians living along Tyrol's southern border were evacuated to either of the two countries, the majority to Bohemian and inner Austrian areas, and some to Italian internment camps, away from the front line.

Part of Italy 
On November 3, 1918, the armistice of Villa Giusti, near Padova ended military operations between Italy and Austria-Hungary. Subsequently, Italian troops entered Tyrol and occupied the Austrian areas south of the Brenner Pass. Italian control of South Tyrol was internationally recognized in 1919. At the time of Bolzano's annexation by the Kingdom of Italy the town was settled primarily by a German-speaking population. As of 1910, 29,000 inhabitants identified themselves as German speakers and only 1,300 as Italian speakers, these latter ones mainly from the Italian speaking areas of Tyrol, namely Welschtirol, currently known as Trentino.

Along with the rest of South Tyrol, Bolzano was subjected to an intensive Italianisation programme enforced by Fascist leader Benito Mussolini from the 1920s onwards to September 8, 1943, when Italy left the military alliance with Nazi Germany and South Tyrol fell under direct German control. The goal of such programme was to outnumber the local German-speaking population by tripling Bolzano's population through Italian immigration from other regions of Italy. In 1927 Bolzano became the capital of the province of Bolzano. Any reference to and use of the words Tyrol and Tyrolean were banned by law and were punishable offences. In 1933, Adolf Hitler came to power in the Weimar Republic. Mussolini and the Fascists worried that Hitler, in pursuing his ideology of all ethnic Germans under one Reich, would claim South Tyrol from Italy. To avoid such prospect, in 1939 Mussolini and Hitler signed the Option Agreement, by which Germany would renounce territorial claims over South Tyrol as Germany's Lebensraum (living space). Furthermore, ethnic South-Tyroleans who had opted to stay in South Tyrol and refused resettlement to the Third Reich were subjected to full-scale Italianisation, including loss of their German names and national identity, prohibition of schooling in German and use of German for their daily transactions.

Second World War 
During the Second World War, Bolzano was the site of the Nazi's Bolzano Transit Camp, a concentration camp for persecuted Jews and political prisoners. Members of the Jewish population of Bolzano were deported to the death camps in Nazi Germany and murdered there. When Italy surrendered in September 1943, the whole of South Tyrol as well as Belluno were de facto administered by the Nazis as Operational Zone of the Alpine Foothills. After 1943, heavy fighting between Nazi Germany and the Allied Powers took place in the Dolomites.

Capital of an autonomous province 
After the War, the Gruber-De Gasperi Agreement of September 1946 was signed by the Italian and Austrian Foreign Ministers in Paris, guaranteeing "complete equality of rights" (including education and use of German as an official language) as well as "autonomous legislative and executive regional power" to the German-speaking population in South Tyrol and Trentino.

Because the implementation of the post-war agreement was not seen as satisfactory by the Austrian government (the autonomous province of 1947 included Trentino and therefore had an Italian-speaking majority), it became a cause of significant friction with Italy and was brought to the General Assembly of the United Nations in 1960, which called for a resolution of the issue. A fresh round of negotiations took place in 1961 but proved unsuccessful, partly because of the campaign of terrorism by South Tyrolean Liberation Committee – a secessionist movement – against Italian police and electric power structures (one notable incident being the Night of Fire on 12 June 1961).

The issue was resolved in 1971, when a new statute of autonomy for the smaller, majority German-speaking province Bozen – Südtirol/Bolzano – Alto Adige, which was supported by the German-speaking population of South Tyrol, was granted by Italy. It resulted in a considerable level of self-government, also due to the large financial resources of South Tyrol, which retains almost 90% of all levied taxes. The agreement was implemented and proved broadly satisfactory to the parties involved and the separatist tensions soon eased. In 1992, Austria and Italy officially ended their dispute over the autonomy issue on the basis of the statute of 1972.

Economy and Research

Economy

The city thrives on a mix of old and new high-quality intensive agriculture (including wine, fruit, and dairy products), tourism, traditional handicraft (wood, ceramics), and advanced services. Heavy industry (machinery, automotive, and steel) installed during the 1930s has now been mostly dismantled.  The local economy is very dependent on the public sector and especially the provincial government.

Bolzano is the biggest city in South Tyrol, which is an autonomous province in Northern Italy with a special statute. This statute preserves the rights of the German-speaking minority in Italy. This unique system was admired by the Dalai Lama, who visited the city on several occasions to study a possible application in Tibet. It has also been presented as role model for the successful and fair resolution of inter-ethnic conflict to other regions of the world.

Exhibition Bolzano

The tradeshows and conferences of the exhibition are concentrated on topics relating to the economies of Alpine countries. There is thus a great focus on tradeshow subjects within the economic competence of South Tyrol and Trentino. The main focuses of dining and leisure time, sports, agriculture, and specific Alpine industries attract an annual total of over 3,000 exhibitors and over 230,000 visitors from all over Europe.

Italian German Business Forum Bozen-Bolzano
Since 2011, the city hosts the Italo-Germanic Business Forum, which brings together the leaders of the Italian and German economies – Confindustria and the Bundesverband der Deutschen Industrie – in the Mercantile Palace to address issues related to the international crisis.

Companies

Large companies in Bolzano are:
 THUN AG
 FERCAM AG
 Spar (retailer) Italia SPA
 Acciaierie Valbruna SPA
 Iveco SPA
 Oberalp AG
 Alperia AG

Research

NOI Techpark

NOI Techpark is on a 12-hectare (30 acre) site in the south of Bolzano, on premises formerly home to aluminium works. The "Nature of Innovation" concept contains: innovation imitating nature. This concept that NOI Techpark is based on, where research institutes, companies and start-ups from South Tyrol and all over the globe will work together to prepare the ground for a sustainable development.

Working with representatives from South Tyrol's business and research communities, BLS and TIS innovation park have developed the park's "Nature of Innovation" positioning title, the initials of which give the park its name: NOI. The name reflects two meanings in South Tyrol: depending on how you want to pronounce it, NOI can either sound like the Italian word for "we" or the South Tyrolean dialect word for "new".
A special focus lies on those fields:
 Alpine Technology
 Renewable Energies and Energy Efficiency
 Food Technology
 ICT & Automation

Free University of Bolzano-Bozen

The Free University of Bolzano-Bozen, founded in October 1997, is actively involved in basic and applied research projects through its five faculties, of which four are located in Bolzano. The university is engaged in a multitude of scientific and technological areas, in addition to different disciplines belonging to Humanities.

Eurac Research
The Eurac Research is a private research center headquartered in Bolzano. The research facility was founded in 1992 and initially had 12 employees. Meanwhile, the Center for Applied Research has more than 300 employees. The topics of this institution include, for example, "Liveable Regions", "Diversity as Added Value" and "Healthy Society". The research has focused more on the Alpine region. Since 2002, the site has been located on Drusus Street, in the former fascist "GIL" building, which was then extensively renovated and integrated with modern buildings. In 2018, the research facility will lead the terraXcube in the NOI Techpark Bolzano. The terraXcube is a research infrastructure that can simulate the most extreme climatic conditions on earth. Air pressure, humidity and solar radiation can be simulated and changed simultaneously in one room. The aim is to investigate how humans react to extreme climatic conditions. Even machines can be tested in this simulator.

Fraunhofer Italia
Fraunhofer Italia is a subsidiary of Fraunhofer Gesellschaft and is headquartered in Bolzano. The company was founded in 2009 and since then specializes in areas such as "Automation and Mechatronic Engineering" and "Process Engineering in Construction". The Organization for Applied Research seeks to help small and medium-sized enterprises in the region through charitable research. Since 2017, the research facility has been based in the Technology Park in Bolzano South.

Politics

City Council

The last municipal elections were held in the year 2020. Of the 45 seats, 9 different parties were elected to the city council. The Partito Democratico (PD), the Südtiroler Volkspartei (SVP) and the Lega Nord (LN) won 7 seats each.

Mayors

This table shows the mayors of the city of Bolzano after 1945. All mayors within this list belong to the Italian language group. So far, the last mayor of the German language group in Bolzano was Julius Perathoner from 1895 to 1922 and was replaced by the march on Bolzano by the fascists.

Euroregion Tyrol-South Tyrol-Trentino
In 1996, the European Union approved further cultural and economic integration between the Austrian province of Tyrol and the Italian autonomous provinces of South Tyrol and Trentino by recognizing the creation of the Euroregion Tyrol-South Tyrol-Trentino.

Main sights

Its medieval city centre, Gothic and Romanesque churches and bilingual signage give it the flavour of a city at the crossroads of Italian and Austrian cultures. This and its natural and cultural attractions make it a popular tourist destination.

Among the major monuments and sights are:
 the Walther Square, with a statue of Walther von der Vogelweide,  a German minstrel (minnesinger)
 the South Tyrol Museum of Archaeology, which has the mummy of Ötzi the Iceman
 the Museion, the Museum of modern and contemporary art of Bolzano
 the Gothic Cathedral, started in 1184, expanded in the 14th century by architects Martin and Peter Schiche and completed in the early 16th century by Hans Lutz von Schussenried
 the Old Parish Church of Gries, with an altarpiece by Michael Pacher
 the benedictine monastery of Muri-Gries, with baroque paintings by Martin Knoller
 the Chiesa dei Domenicani/Dominikanerkirche (13th century), with a series of 14th-century Gothic paintings
 various castles, including Castle Maretsch, Runkelstein Castle and Firmian/Sigmundskron Castle
 Victory Monument, a triumphal arch built on the order of Benito Mussolini in 1928, site of a permanent exhibition on the regional history in the context of the two dictatorships of the Italian Fascism and the German Nazism
 the former Casa del Fascio, recontextualized in 2017
 Messner Mountain Museum of Reinhold Messner

For more historical and geographical information see South Tyrol.

Gallery

Culture

Museums

 South Tyrol Museum of Archaeology, is the exhibition location of the Ötzi. The museum also exhibits other archaeological finds from the South Tyrolean region. Due to the Ötzi, it is one of the leading archaeological museums in Italy.
 Runkelstein Castle, was built in 1237 by the brothers Friedrich and Beral von Wangen. The castle became known for its extensive and profane fresco cycle from the Middle Ages.
 Bolzano City Museum; The collections of the museum include works of art as paintings, sculptures, altars and folklore objects of daily life from all over South Tyrol. The access to the museum is limited and only a part of the valuable collection is visible. The museum, built in 1905, is in the planning stage for an extension that would be fully accessible.
 Nature Museum South Tyrol, is dedicated to areas such as geology, flora and fauna. The exhibition shows the emergence of South Tyrolean landscapes, for example the Dolomites, and natural science collections from the South Tyrolean region.
 Museion, is a museum of Modern and Contemporary Art. The museum was founded in 1985 and today, since 2008, has its headquarters on "Talferwiesen". The modern cube, including bridges, was planned by the architects' office "Krüger, Schubert, Vandreike (KSV)".
 Mercantile Museum of Bolzano, tells about the economic history of Bolzano and its importance in Central Europe as a bridge between North and South. The museum used to be the seat of the former Mercantile Magistrate. It also documents the trade fairs and their significance for the trading city.
 Bolzano School Museum, reports about the development of the school in South Tyrol since the introduction of the compulsory education of Empress Maria Theresia in the year 1774. Special features of this museum are, among other things, the presentation of the catacomb schools and the documentation about the Jewish school home near Merano.
 Bolzano Cathedral Treasury, was founded in 2007 and has its seat near the Cathedral of Bolzano. The museum shows sacred art such as church treasures, 18th-century paintings and goldsmithing.
 MMM Firmian, is one of six locations of the museum project of mountaineer Reinhold Messner. The MMM Firmian is located at Sigmundskron Castle and is also the headquarters of the project. Themes of this museum are the history of mountaineering and the art of mountaineering. It shows the connection between the people and the mountains. Additionally, Reinhold Messner's experiences, collections and memories of the expeditions will be exhibited.
 Semi-rural House, was one of many houses built in the Semi-rural zone during the 1930s for industrial workers. It documents the development of this district at that time until the 1980s.
 Documentation Center "BZ '18–'45: one monument, one city, two dictatorships", Victory Monument. The museum is located below the Victory Monument and documents the time of the population of Bolzano and South Tyrol during the Italian fascism and after 1943 the German National Socialism. It is the first museum in Italy to work on the fascism under Benito Mussolini. In 2016, the Museum received a lot of recognition from the jury of the European Museum of the Year Award for exhibiting this sensitive topic.
 Pons Drusi Museum, located in the retirement home "Grieserhof" and showing archaeological remains such as frescoes and vases from Roman antiquity. The remaining walls indicate a former temple complex and a building with a pillared hall. Several objects from the first century AD were found, showing the life of the Romans in Gries-Bolzano at that time.

Libraries and Archives
 Tessmann Library
 University Library of Bozen-Bolzano
 South Tyrolean Provincial Archives
 Civic Archives in Bozen-Bolzano

Cinema and Theatre

 Bolzano Civic Theatre - Stadttheater Bozen; the new city theater was opened in 1999 according to the plans of the architect Marco Zanuso. For a long time, the city had no city theater because the old one was destroyed in World War II. It is the seat of the United Stages Bolzano (VBB) and has 2 halls. The theater features performances in Italian and German.
 Concert Hall Bolzano, was also opened in 1999 and is the seat of the Haydn Orchestra of Bolzano and Trento. Every two years the famous Ferruccio Busoni International Piano Competition is held in the auditorium.
 Haus der Kultur Walther von der Vogelweide (Culture house Walther von der Vogelweide), is a theater that presents a majority of performances in German. It is located in the center of the city and can accommodate about 500 people.
 Teatro Cristallo, is located outside the center in Dalmatienstreet. Most of the performances are presented in Italian.
 Stadttheater Gries (City theater Gries), located in the district of Gries-Quirein and can accommodate 371 people. Performances are presented in German and Italian.
 Theater im Hof (Theatre in the courtyard), is located on Obstplatz and dedicated to the children and youth theater. An additional focus of the small theater is the topic of "women in and at the theater".
 Carambolage; in this venue improvisational theater and other forms of cabaret are offered. It is located in the center of the city.
 Batzen Sudwerk; below the 600-year-old brewery is a cultural workshop in the basement. There are offered often performances in the form of cabaret.
 Teatro Cinema Rainerum; at the Rainerum Institute in the Don Bosco district there is a theater for about 400 people.
 Filmclub Bolzano (Movie club Bolzano), is a cinema with 3 rooms and also shows several films of regional directors and actors. The Filmclub is also the venue of the Bolzano Filmfestival. The cinema is located in the old town of Bolzano.
 Cineplexx, was opened in 2009 and offers a majority of films in German. In addition to films in German and Italian, other films are also available in English. The cinema has 7 rooms.
 UCI Cinema, opened in 2015 and is located in the shopping center "Twenty". Most of the 6 halls offer films in Italian. Also in this cinema are occasionally shown films in English and German.

Cultural events
Bolzano organizes the following events every year:
 Südtirol JazzFestival, is a festival that not only takes place in Bolzano but is also performed all over South Tyrol. The jazz festival lasts up to 10 days and performs 90 concerts in 50 different locations with over 150 jazz musicians. International jazz musicians such as Don Cherry, Randy Brecker, Carla Bley, Chick Corea, Pat Metheny, and Collin Walcott participated in this event.
 Ferruccio Busoni International Piano Competition, is an international piano competition and is held every 2 years. This competition was initiated by the director of the Conservatory of Music "Claudio Monteverdi" in memory of the 25th anniversary of the death of Ferruccio Busoni. The artist influenced Italian and German music art and was therefore a symbol of the South Tyrolean culture.
 Bolzano Filmfestival Bozen; The first Bolzano film festival was held in 1987 under the name "Bozner Filmtage". It serves as a platform for the local film scene and creates contact between filmmakers and audiences. Films in Italian and German are shown. Artists like Tobias Moretti, Fred Zinnemann, Herbert Achternbusch, Michele Placido, and Jiri Menzel participated in this event.
 Bolzano Festival Bozen, is a festival that takes place every summer and offers classical music. The European Union Youth Orchestra, the Gustav Mahler Jugendorchester and the participants of the Ferruccio Busoni Competition are performing regularly.
 Tanz Bozen - Bolzano Danza, is an international contemporary dance festival and is held every summer. It is a festival that shows different dance performances in different places of the city. It is organized by the Haydn Foundation of Bolzano and Trento.
 Christmas market Bozen; The Bolzano Christmas Market was founded in 1990 as Italy's first Christmas market. The stands are located in different places of the old town. With over 1.2 million visitors (2005), the Bolzano Christmas Market is the most visited in Italy.
 Bolzano ShortFilmFestival, also collaborates with the Bolzano Filmfestival and awards prizes for the best short films without words ("No Words"). Indedpently of the Bolzano Filmfestival it also awards prizes for the best Italian short film. The festival was held in 1968 for the first time.

Education

Free University of Bozen-Bolzano

The Free University of Bozen-Bolzano was founded in 1997 and has its headquarters in the city of Bolzano. It offers trilingual courses in German, Italian and English. The unibz was the first trilingual university in Europe. Other university locations are in Brixen and Bruneck. Through the Euroregion Tyrol-South Tyrol-Trentino, the university also works closely together with the universities of Innsbruck and Trento. The University of Bolzano has the following five faculties:
 Economics
 Computer science
 Design and arts
 Science and technology
 Education

State College of Health Professions "Claudiana"
 
The State College of Health Professions "Claudiana" was founded in 1993 and has since 2006 its headquarters next to the regional hospital of Bolzano outside the center. The college was named after the Regent of the Austrian County of Tyrol, Claudia de Medici. The college serves to train health professionals, such as nurses, midwives, technical medicine and rehabilitation specialists. Teaching is in Italian and German.

Conservatory "Claudio Monteverdi"

The conservatory "Claudio Monteverdi" is a college of music in Bolzano. The conservatory was founded in 1927 and has since been named after the former Italian composer Claudio Monteverdi. The rooms of the conservatory are located in the Dominican monastery. The Academy of Music gained international recognition through the biennial Ferruccio Busoni International Piano Competition.

Transport

Bolzano is connected to the motorway network A22-E45 to Trento and Verona and to Innsbruck (Austria) and Munich (Germany). In Bolzano South there is a transport hub that connects the dual carriageway MeBo with the A22 motorway. The dual carriageway MeBo (Merano - Bolzano) was completed in 1997 to quickly connect the two metropolitan areas of South Tyrol, Merano and Bolzano, and to relieve the surrounding communities in the district of Burggrafenamt and the old former two-lane State street SS38 (Strada statale 38).

The city is also connected to the Italian railway system. Bolzano railway station, opened in 1859, forms part of the Brenner railway (Verona–Innsbruck), which is part of the main railway route between Italy and Germany. The station is also a junction of two branch lines, to Merano and Mals. The station of Bolzano is served by Frecciarossa and Frecciargento trains of Trenitalia, Italo EVO of Nuovo Trasporto Viaggiatori (from August 2018) and EuroCity trains of ÖBB.

A two-line light rail network is planned to serve Bolzano, at a length of 7.2 km ( miles) with 17 stops, with a projected cost of €192 million.

There is a  network of cycle paths, and about 30 percent of journeys in Bolzano are made by bicycle.

Until summer 2015 there was a regular connection between Bolzano Airport (IATA: BZO) and Rome. In summer charter flights are offered to Cagliari, Olbia, Lamezia Terme and Catania.

Since 1966 a cable car connects the centre of Bolzano with Oberbozen-Soprabolzano and the community of Ritten. In 2009 the Italian manufacturer Leitner replaced the old cable car with a new modern 3S system. Although the so-called "Rittner Seilbahn" primarily serves the tourist market, it also provides an important transit link for the residents of Renon. The cable car system, which can carry up to 726 persons per hour, is the first tricable gondola lift in Italy.

Sport
The town is host to an annual road running competition – the BOclassic – which features an elite men's 10K and women's 5K races. The event, first held in 1975, takes place on New Year's Eve and is broadcast live on television by Rai Sport Più.

Bolzano is also the host city to the Giro delle Dolomiti annual road bike event.

Local teams
Football

 F.C. Südtirol
 A.C. Virtus Bolzano
 Bozner F.C.
 F.C. Neugries
 F.C. Bolzano 1996 
 Virtus Don Bosco

Handball

 Loacker Bozen Handball Handball A-Elite Liga

Ice hockey

 EV Bozen 96 plays in Serie A2
 HC Bolzano Bozen Foxes plays in Serie A1 and the EBEL League, winning the EBEL title in their Debut year 2014

Rugby

 Sudtirolo Rugby Cavaliers The Cavaliers play in the Italian Serie C

American football

 Giants Bolzano The Giants plays in IFL (Italian Football League), the first league of the FIDAF

Softball and baseball

 Adler
 Pool 77
 Softball Club Dolomiti

Fistball

 SSV Bozen plays in the FBL (Austrian Fistball League), the first Austrian league.

Notable people

Notable people born in or associated with Bolzano include:
 Blessed Henry of Treviso (died 1315), a lay pilgrim and holy man, a German from Bolzano
18th C
 Joseph Tiefenthaler (1710–1785), a Jesuit missionary who wrote about India
 Johann Nepomuk von Tschiderer zu Gleifheim (1777–1860), Prince-Bishop of Trent
 Archduke Rainer Joseph of Austria (1783–1853), Viceroy of Lombardy-Venetia
 Jacob Anton Zallinger zum Thurn (1735–1813), philosopher and canonist 
 Annette of Menz (1796–1869), in 1811 she was the richest heiress in Bolzano
19th C
 Daniel Harrwitz (1821 – 1884 in Bolzano), German chess master
 Heinrich Anton of Austria (1828-1891), Archduke of Austria
 Anton Ausserer (1843–1889), naturalist and arachnologist
 Alois Riehl (1844–1924), neo-Kantian philosopher
 Julius Perathoner (1849–1926), last mayor of Bolzano of German ethnicity, 1895-1922
 Alois Delug (1859–1930), painter and a professor at the Academy of Fine Arts, Vienna; rejected Adolf Hitler's application to join the academy. 
 Ludwig Thuille (1861–1907), composer, teacher and music theorist
 Prince Carlos of Bourbon-Two Sicilies (1870–1949), member of the Spanish Royal family
 Karl Theodor Hoeniger (1881–1970), author and cultural historian
 Ressel Orla (1889–1931), actress, appeared in some of Fritz Lang's earliest films
 Max Valier (1895–1930), rocketry pioneer, astronomer and writer
 Christian Hess (1895–1944), painter and sculptor
20th C
 Josef Mayr-Nusser (1910–1945), South Tyrolean leader of the resistance against Nazi rule
 Maria Luise Thurmair (1912–2005), a Catholic theologian, hymnodist and writer
 Carlo Maria Giulini (1914–2005), conductor
 Silvius Magnago (1914-2010), lawyer and politician
 Maria Gardena (1920–2008) film actress and later architect
 Alcide Berloffa (1922-2011), politician 
 Valentin Braitenberg (1926-2011), brain researcher, cyberneticist and writer
 Dorian Gray (1928-2011), actress 
 Herbert Rosendorfer (1934–2012), German jurist and writer
 Giuseppe Anfossi (born 1935), bishop emeritus of the Roman Catholic Diocese of Aosta 1994 to 2011. 
 Adolf Dallapozza (born 1940), tenor in opera, operetta and musical theatre at the Vienna Volksoper
 Ottavia Piccolo (born 1949), theatre and film actress 
 Matteo Thun (born 1952), an architect and designer
 Andrea Bonatta (born 1952), pianist and conductor
 Franz Fischnaller (born 1954), new media artist and transdisciplinary researcher
 Cuno Tarfusser (born 1954), former judge of the International Criminal Court
 Lilli Gruber (born 1957), journalist, former politician and TV talk show host
 Marco Bergamo (1966-2017) the Monster of Bolzano, an Italian serial killer
 Sergio Azzolini (born 1967) bassoonist and music conductor
 Anna Unterberger (born 1985) actress 
Sport

 Paula Wiesinger (1907-2001), mountaineer, ski racer and restaurateur
 Erika Lechner (born 1947), luger, medallist at the 1968 Winter Olympics
 Hans Kammerlander (born 1956), mountaineer
 Antonella Bellutti (born 1968), racing cyclist and two-time Olympic champion in track cycling
 Gerda Weissensteiner (born 1969), luger and bobsleigh pilot, competed in six Winter Olympics, gold medallist in the women's singles luge at the 1994 Winter Olympics and bronze medallist in the two-woman bobsleigh at the 2006 Winter Olympics
 Ylenia Scapin (born 1975), judoka, won two Olympic medals in different weight classes in 1996 and 2000. 
 Isolde Kostner (born 1975), Alpine skier, two bronze medals at the 1994 Winter Olympics and a silver medal at the 2002 Winter Olympics
 Karen Putzer (born 1978), former alpine skier, bronze medallist at the 2002 Winter Olympics 
 Andreas Seppi (born 1984), tennis player, has reached a career-high singles ranking of World Nr. 18. 
 Tania Cagnotto (born 1985), world and European champion in diving, Olympic bronze and silver medallist
 Carolina Kostner (born 1987), figure skater, World Champion and Olympic bronze medalist
 Raphael Andergassen (born 1993), ice hockey player
 Alex Trivellato (born 1993), ice hockey player
 Peter Hochkofler (born 1994), ice hockey player

International relations

Twin towns – sister cities
Bolzano is twinned with:

See also
 History of South Tyrol
 Italianization of South Tyrol
 Jacob Anton Zallinger zum Thurn
 Radio Tandem
 Tyrol
 Bozner Blutsonntag

References

Bibliography

External links

 Bolzano City Hall Official website (in Italian and German)
 Bolzano Tourist Board Official website

Bolzano